The 2014–15 season was PAOK Football Club's 89th in existence and the club's 56th consecutive season in the top flight of Greek football. The team will enter the Greek Football Cup in the Second Round and will also compete in UEFA Europa League starting from the Play-off round.

On 19 May 2014, Angelos Anastasiadis become PAOK's manager by signing a two-year contract.

Players

Squad

Out on loan

Kit

|
|
|
|

Pre-season and friendlies

Competitions

Overview

Managerial statistics

Super League Greece

League table

Results summary

Results by round

Matches

Play-offs

Table

Matches

Greek Cup

Greek Football Cup

Group stage

UEFA Europa League

Play-off Round

Group stage

Statistics

Squad statistics

Goalscorers

1Match on 25 January 2015 (Niki Volou) awarded 0-3 by FA decision.

Disciplinary record

Last updated: 2015  
Source: Match reports in competitive matches, superleaguegreece.net,uefa.com, paokfc.gr, soccerway.com 
Only competitive matches 
 = Number of bookings;  = Number of sending offs after a second yellow card;  = Number of sending offs by a direct red card.
0 shown as blank

References

External links
 PAOK FC official website

PAOK FC seasons
PAOK FC season